Tarnawa may refer to:

Places 
Tarnawa, Lesser Poland Voivodeship, Poland
Tarnawa, Lubusz Voivodeship, Poland
Tarnawa, Świętokrzyskie Voivodeship, Poland

Other uses 
 Tarnawa (horse), a racehorse